A baby announcement or birth announcement is a notice traditionally sent to friends and family by the parents of a baby within the first year of the baby's birth for the primary purpose of alerting friends and family to the birth of the baby.  A baby announcement will typically include at least some or all of the following information:

 the baby's name
 one or more pictures of the baby
 the baby's birth date and time
 the baby's birth weight and height
 the location of the baby's birth
 the names of the baby's parents and other family members
 an expression of gratitude by the parents for the arrival of the baby
 an invitation to attend a baby shower for the mother of the baby

British parents may place a birth announcement in their local newspaper. Once a name has been chosen they may send out an American-style card.

History & Origin

The birth of a child has been celebrated since before records began and many religions have narratives about the birth of their god or spiritual leader.  The earliest newspapers carried birth announcements and announcement cards became commercially available in mid-19th century Britain. Traditionally birth announcements give the names of the child, the time and date of birth, the sex and the weight.

Notes

References
 
 
 

Greeting cards